Saint-Romain may refer to:

Places

Canada
Saint-Romain, Quebec

France
 Saint-Romain, Charente
 Saint-Romain, Côte-d'Or
Saint-Romain, former commune of the Dordogne department, now part of Saint-Romain-et-Saint-Clément
Saint-Romain, former commune of the Lot department, now part of Gourdon
 Saint-Romain, Puy-de-Dôme
 Saint-Romain, former commune of the Haute-Savoie department, now part of Reignier
 Saint-Romain, Vienne, in the Vienne department
 Saint-Romain-au-Mont-d'Or, in the Rhône department
 Saint-Romain-d'Ay, in the Ardèche department
 Saint-Romain-de-Benet, in the Charente-Maritime department
 Saint-Romain-de-Colbosc, in the Seine-Maritime department
 Saint-Romain-de-Jalionas, in the Isère department
 Saint-Romain-de-Lerps, in the Ardèche department
 Saint-Romain-de-Monpazier, in the Dordogne department
 Saint-Romain-de-Popey, in the Rhône department
 Saint-Romain-de-Surieu, in the Isère department
 Saint-Romain-d'Urfé, in the Loire department
 Saint-Romain-en-Gal, in the Rhône department
 Saint-Romain-en-Gier, in the Rhône department
 Saint-Romain-en-Jarez, in the Loire department
 Saint-Romain-en-Viennois, in the Vaucluse department
 Saint-Romain-et-Saint-Clément, in the Dordogne department
 Saint-Romain-Lachalm, in the Haute-Loire department
 Saint-Romain-la-Motte, in the Loire department
 Saint-Romain-la-Virvée, in the Gironde department
 Saint-Romain-le-Noble, in the Lot-et-Garonne department
 Saint-Romain-le-Preux, in the Yonne department
 Saint-Romain-le-Puy, in the Loire department
 Saint-Romain-les-Atheux, in the Loire department
 Saint-Romain-sous-Gourdon, in the Saône-et-Loire department
 Saint-Romain-sous-Versigny, in the Saône-et-Loire department
 Saint-Romain-sur-Cher, in the Loir-et-Cher department
 Saint-Romain-sur-Gironde, in the Charente-Maritime department

Other uses
 Saint-Romain wine, from the Saint-Romain commune in Côte-d'Or
 Saint Romanus (disambiguation), a number of Catholic saints

See also
 Romain (disambiguation)
 Romaine (disambiguation)